Benton Township is a township in Des Moines County, Iowa, United States.

History
Benton Township was established in 1841. It was originally called Tamey Township.

References

Townships in Des Moines County, Iowa
1841 establishments in Iowa Territory
Townships in Iowa